Innovis is the credit reporting division of CBC Companies and is considered the fourth largest consumer credit reporting agency in the United States, behind the “big three” Experian, TransUnion, and Equifax. Based in Columbus, Ohio, the company offers services like fraud protection, credit information, identity verification, and receivables management.

Company history

Innovis began as ACB Services, founded by Associated Credit Bureaus (ACB) in 1970.

In 1989, ACB Services was purchased and renamed Consumers Credit Associates (CCA). First Data Corporation purchased CCA and renamed it Innovis, Inc. in 1997. Most recently, CBC Companies purchased Innovis, Inc. in 1999. 

Although they have the same parent company, Innovis is different than CBCInnovis, which merged with mortgage credit-reporting agency, Factual Data, in 2019.

Products
Identity verification
Receivables management
Fraud and identity theft prevention
Consumer Reports

Credit reports 
The company's credit reports contain your personal information and credit history. It does not include your credit score. Their reports are most often used for pre-screened marketing offers. Their services are also used by cell phone service providers.

Innovis also collects non-traditional credit information like rent payments, magazine subscriptions and utility bills.

FailSafe Fraud Suite 
Under the direction of Bruce Nixon, president of Innovis, the company launched the FailSafe Fraud Suite, which provides multi-layer authentication that works to identify abnormal patterns of behavior in an effort to fight fraud.

References

External links

Credit scoring
American companies established in 1970
Financial services companies established in 1970
Financial services companies of the United States
1970 establishments in Ohio
1989 mergers and acquisitions
1997 mergers and acquisitions
1999 mergers and acquisitions